Paweł Rabczewski (born 20 November 1949) is a Polish weightlifter. He competed in the men's light heavyweight event at the 1980 Summer Olympics.

References

1949 births
Living people
Polish male weightlifters
Olympic weightlifters of Poland
Weightlifters at the 1980 Summer Olympics
Sportspeople from Vilnius
Soviet emigrants to Poland
World Weightlifting Championships medalists